Mundys Mill is an unincorporated community in Clayton County, in the U.S. state of Georgia.

History
The community was named after E. T. and R. W. Mundy, proprietors of a local gristmill.

Education
Mundy's Mill High School is operated by the Clayton County School District.

References

Unincorporated communities in Clayton County, Georgia